Adelaide railway station is located in the townland of Malone Lower in south Belfast, County Antrim, Northern Ireland. It is located just off the Lisburn Road and close to many Queen's University students' houses.

The station was opened by the Great Northern Railway of Ireland on 1 November 1897 and was originally called Adelaide and Windsor. It was renamed Adelaide in 1935. It became an unstaffed halt in October 1996.

The station also serves the nearby Windsor Park stadium, which is the current home of the Northern Ireland national football team.

Beside Adelaide Station there are extensive yard facilities and these used to be packed with cement, container, beer and fertiliser trains. Freight north of the border ended in the late 1990s and the yard has lain empty since. When the 80 Class units were withdrawn from service in 2005 they came to Adelaide to be stored. The yard has been developed into a new DMU depot for the Class 4000 trains recently introduced by Northern Ireland Railways.

Maintenance Depot
Adjacent to the halt is Adelaide Maintenance Depot for NIR's 3000 Class and 4000 Class DMU's. It is built on the site of the former freight terminal, and consists of a 2-road running shed, 5 stabling sidings, a fuelling apron, a trainwash and 2 sidings for Permanent Way use. It was officially opened on 12 December 2012.

Service
Extra trains operate at peak times, and the service reduces to hourly operation in the evenings.

On Sundays there is an hourly service in each direction.

Gallery

References

Railway stations in Belfast
Railway stations opened in 1897
Railway stations served by NI Railways
Railway stations in Northern Ireland opened in the 19th century